Negus is a title in the Eritrean and Northern Ethiopian Semitic languages.

Negus may also refer to:
 Negus (surname), a surname
 Negus (drink), a hot mixed drink of wine
 Negus Mine, a Canadian gold producer 1939–1952
 Negus (album), by Mos Def, 2019